5-in-1 blanks (commonly called "five-in-ones" in the film industry) are blank cartridges that can be used in a variety of firearms. They are specifically made for theatrical use and are commonly used in real firearms for dramatic effect. Since the loud report and flash of ignition, and not the projection of a bullet, is the goal of the cartridge, it can be used in firearms with different bore sizes. These cartridges can be loaded with different charges, ranging from quarter-load charges for indoor scenes and scenes around animals, up to full-load charges for outdoor firing.

5-in-1 blanks can be used in firearms chambered for the .38-40 Winchester, .44-40 Winchester, .45 Colt, .44 Magnum, and .44 Special because, although the bores differ in diameter, the chambers are of similar shape. They were called a 5-in-1 blanks, because, when they were originally introduced, they could be fired in the five different firearms commonly used in Hollywood Westerns, namely .38-40 and .44-40 Winchester rifles and .38-40, .44-40, and .45 Colt revolvers. 5-in-1 blanks are also called a 3-in-1 blanks for the three weapon calibers in which they are fired, namely .38-40, .44-40, and .45 Colt.

The 5-in-1 blanks in use today have been redesigned and are made with plastic cases that can be used not only in .38-40, .44-40, and .45 Colt calibers, but also .44 Special, .44 Magnum, and .410 bore firearms. They are available in crimped and open-ended (balloon) varieties and are made using both black powder and smokeless powder. The black powder blanks produce not only a loud report and flash, but also a cloud of white smoke.

Notes

Sources 
  — Sporting Arms and Ammunition Manufacturers' Institute

Ammunition
Special effects
Blank cartridges